Dale County is a county located in the southeastern part of the U.S. state of Alabama. As of the 2020 census the population was 49,326. Its county seat and largest city is Ozark. Its name is in honor of General Samuel Dale.

Dale County comprises the Ozark, AL Micropolitan Statistical Area, which is also included in the Dothan-Ozark, AL Combined Statistical Area. It was originally a part of Enterprise–Ozark micropolitan area before being split, and for a longer while was originally part of the Dothan-Enterprise-Ozark combined statistical area but Coffee County is now its own separate primary statistical area in later censuses.

The vast majority of Fort Rucker is located in Dale County.

History
The area now known as Dale County was originally inhabited by members of the Creek Indian nation, who occupied all of southeastern Alabama during this period.  Between the years of 1764 and 1783 this region fell under the jurisdiction of the colony of British West Florida.  The county, together with the surrounding area, was ceded to the United States in the 1814 Treaty of Fort Jackson, ending the Creek Indian Wars.  A blockhouse had been constructed during the conflict on the northwestern side of the Choctawhatchee River, and the first non-Indian residents of Dale County would be veterans who began to settle in the area around 1820.

Dale County was established on December 22, 1824.  It originally included the whole of what is now Coffee County and Geneva County, together with the "panhandle" portion of Houston County.  The original county seat was located at Dale's Court House (now the town of Daleville), but when Coffee County split from Dale in 1841, the seat was moved to Newton.  Here it remained until 1870 when, following a courthouse fire in 1869 and the formation of Geneva County (which took the southern third of Dale County), the county seat was moved to the town of Ozark, where it remains.  In 1903 a small portion of the southeast part of Dale county was joined to the newly formed Houston County.

Portions of the 15th Regiment of Alabama Infantry, which served with great distinction throughout the U.S. Civil War, were recruited in Dale County, with all of Co. "E" and part of Co. "H" being composed of Dale County residents.  This unit is most famous for being the regiment that confronted the 20th Maine on the Little Round Top during the Battle of Gettysburg on July 2, 1863.  Despite several ferocious assaults, the 15th was ultimately unable to dislodge the Union troops, and was ultimately forced to retreat after a desperate bayonet charge led by the 20th Maine's commander, Col. Joshua L. Chamberlain.  This assault was vividly recreated in Ronald F. Maxwell's 1993 film Gettysburg.  The 15th would continue to serve until the final capitulation of Lee's army at Appomattox Court House in 1865.

Another regiment recruited largely from Dale County was the 33rd Alabama; Companies B, G and I were recruited in the county, with Co. G coming from Daleville; Co. B from Newton, Skipperville, Clopton, Echo and Barnes Cross Roads; and Co. I from Newton, Haw Ridge, Rocky Head, Westville and Ozark.  This regiment fought with great distinction in the Army of Tennessee, mostly under famed General Patrick Cleburne, once winning the Thanks of the Confederate Congress for its action at Ringgold Gap.  The regiment was largely annihilated during the battles of Perryville and Franklin, but a few men survived and returned to Dale County after the war.

Geography
The county is located in the Wiregrass region of southeast Alabama.

It is the fifth-smallest county in Alabama by land area and third-smallest by total area.

Major highways

 U.S. Highway 84
 U.S. Highway 231
 State Route 27
 State Route 51
 State Route 85
 State Route 92
 State Route 123
 State Route 134
 State Route 248
 State Route 249

Adjacent counties
Pike County (northwest)
Barbour County (north)
Henry County (east)
Houston County (southeast)
Geneva County (southwest)
Coffee County (west)

Demographics

2000 census
As of the census of 2000, there were 49,129 people, 18,878 households, and 13,629 families living in the county. The population density was 88 people per square mile (34/km2). There were 21,779 housing units at an average density of 39 per square mile (15/km2). The racial makeup of the county was 74.4% White, 20.4% Black or African American, 0.60% Native American, 1.1% Asian, 0.15% Pacific Islander, 1.3% from other races, and 2.2% from two or more races. 3.4% of the population were Hispanic or Latino of any race. 2.85% of the population reported speaking Spanish at home, while 1.51% speak German.

There were 18,878 households, out of which 36% had ch—ildren under the age of 18 living with them, 55% were married couples living together, 13.6% had a female householder with no husband present, and 27.8% were non-families. 24.3% of all households were made up of individuals, and 8.8% had someone living alone who was 65 years of age or older. The average household size was 2.5 and the average family size was 3.0.

In the county, the population was spread out, with 26.6% under the age of 18, 9.6% from 18 to 24, 30.3% from 25 to 44, 21.8% from 45 to 64, and 11.8% who were 65 years of age or older. The median age was 34 years. For every 100 females, there were 98.3 males. For every 100 females age 18 and over, there were 95 males.

The median income for a household in the county was $31,998, and the median income for a family was $37,806. Males had a median income of $29,844 versus $19,988 for females. The per capita income for the county was $16,010. 15% of the population and 12.6% of families were below the poverty line. 19.4% of those under the age of 18 and 16.5% of those 65 and older were living below the poverty line.

2010 census
As of the census of 2010, there were 50,251 people, 20,065 households, and 13,721 families living in the county.  The population density was 90 people per square mile (35/km2). There were 22,677 housing units at an average density of 40 per square mile (15/km2). The racial makeup of the county was 74.1% White, 19.3% Black or African American, 0.7% Native American, 1.1% Asian, 0.1% Pacific Islander, 1.8% from other races, and 3.0% from two or more races. 5.6% of the population were Hispanic or Latino of any race.

There were 20,065 households, out of which 30.1% had children under the age of 18 living with them, 48.9% were married couples living together, 14.6% had a female householder with no husband present, and 31.6% were non-families. 27.3% of all households were made up of individuals, and 9.6% had someone living alone who was 65 years of age or older.  The average household size was 2.46 and the average family size was 2.98.

In the county, the population was spread out, with 24.8% under the age of 18, 9.4% from 18 to 24, 26.7% from 25 to 44, 25.7% from 45 to 64, and 13.5% who were 65 years of age or older.  The median age was 36.1 years. For every 100 females, there were 97.6 males.  For every 100 females age 18 and over, there were 101.0 males.

The median income for a household in the county was $43,353, and the median income for a family was $50,685. Males had a median income of $24,569 versus $34,856 for females. The per capita income for the county was $21,722. 14.8% of the population and 11.4% of families were below the poverty line. 19.6% of those under the age of 18 and 10.2% of those 65 and older were living below the poverty line.

2020 census

As of the 2020 United States census, there were 49,326 people, 18,806 households, and 12,515 families residing in the county.

Government
Dale County is reliably Republican at the presidential level. The last Democrat to win the county in a presidential election is Jimmy Carter, who won it by a majority in 1976.

Education
Most areas are zoned to Dale County School District. However four municipalities have their own school districts: Daleville City School District, Dothan City School District, Enterprise City School District, and Ozark City School District. Additionally residents of Fort Rucker are assigned to schools operated by the Department of Defense Education Activity (DoDEA), for elementary school. 
Students beyond the elementary level at Fort Rucker may attend non-DoDEA schools for secondary levels, with an on-post family choosing one of the following three options: Daleville City, Enterprise City, or Ozark City.

Communities

Cities
Daleville
Dothan (partly in Houston County and Henry County)
Enterprise (partly in Coffee County)
Level Plains
Ozark (county seat)

Towns
Ariton
Clayhatchee
Grimes
Midland City
Napier Field
Newton
Pinckard

Census-designated place
Fort Rucker (U.S. Army base)

Unincorporated communities

Arguta
Asbury
Barnes
Bertha
Clopton
Dillard
Echo
Ewell
Gerald
Kelly
Mabson
Rocky Head
Skipperville
Sylvan Grove

Notable people
Samuel Dale (1772 – May 24, 1841), was an American frontiersman, known as the "Daniel Boone of Alabama", is buried here.
Nolan Williams (1941-2022), Alabama state representative

See also
National Register of Historic Places listings in Dale County, Alabama
Properties on the Alabama Register of Landmarks and Heritage in Dale County, Alabama

References

External links
 Dale County Sheriff's Office

 

 
Enterprise–Ozark micropolitan area
1824 establishments in Alabama
Populated places established in 1824